Madrasa Marjania is one of the madrasahs of the medina of Tunis, built between 1293 and 1299 by Abu Mohamed Abdullah Al Morjani.
Like the Abi Mohamed Al Morjani Mosque it took its name from him. It served as a mausoleum before becoming a madrasa by the order of Muhammad I, one of the Hafsid rulers.

Location 

The madrasa is located in the northern suburb of the medina, near Bab el Khadra, one of its gates.

Teachers 
Salem Bouhageb, a friend of the Grand Vizier Hayreddin Pasha, was one of the most important teachers of this madrasa and was later replaced by Sheikh Mohamed Taieb Ennaifer.

References 

Marjania